Miesville Ravine Park Reserve is a Dakota County park near the town of Miesville, Minnesota, United States. Most of the park is wooded with mature oak, maple, cottonwood, willow, red cedar, and white pine. A trout stream, Trout Brook, is located in the reserve.

Hiking trails
Year-round hiking trails within the reserve consist of more than  total. There are two picnic shelters available on a first-come, first-served basis or are available for rent.

Trout Brook

Trout Brook is in a karst landscape. Tributaries of Trout Brook include Weber Run and an East Branch and West Branch of Trout Run. Several springs have been identified that feed cold water to the stream. These springs have been monitored for several decades to monitor pollution. Trout Brook is a tributary of the Cannon River, which flows into the Mississippi River at Red Wing. The entire length of Trout Brook has been designated a trout stream by the Minnesota Department of Natural Resources. The stream constains Brook trout and brown trout.

There are also Trout Brooks in Pine, Ramsey, Wabasha, and Washington Counties, Minnesota.

See also
List of rivers of Minnesota

References

Protected areas of Dakota County, Minnesota
Regional parks in Minnesota
Rivers of Dakota County, Minnesota
Southern Minnesota trout streams